Raymond Saade (born 6 March 1990 in Sydney, Australia) is a former professional rugby league footballer. In October 2015, Saade signed with the Wentworthville Magpies for the 2016 New South Wales Cup Season.

References
 

Australian rugby league players
1990 births
Living people
Rugby league players from Sydney